Gaillardia × grandiflora, known as blanket flower, is a hybrid species of flowering plant in the sunflower family Asteraceae, which is a cross of garden origin between G. aristata × G. pulchella.

Description
This herbaceous perennial and its cultivars are valued for their large ornamental blooms in summer and autumn.

Cultivation
It is usually grown as a half-hardy annual, especially in cooler climates. It has won the Royal Horticultural Society's Award of Garden Merit. 

Several other cultivars exist, in the same range of colours (red, orange and yellow).

References

grandiflora
Garden plants
Hybrid plants